The 2000 Artistic Gymnastics World Cup Final was held in Glasgow, Scotland in 2000. This was the second edition of the World Cup Final. From 1999 to 2000, a series of qualifying events were held, culminating in a final event, the World Cup Final. The different stages, sometimes referred to as World Cup Qualifiers, mostly served the purpose of awarding points to individual gymnasts and groups according to their placements. These points would be added up over the two-year period to qualify a limited number of athletes to the biennial World Cup Final event.

Medal winners

References

2000
Artistic Gymnastics World Cup
International gymnastics competitions hosted by the United Kingdom
2000 in British sport